Rafael Rodríguez González may refer to:

 Rafael Rodríguez González (Puerto Rican politician) (fl. 1990s)
 Rafael Rodríguez González (Mexican politician) (born 1972)